Stellwagen Bank National Marine Sanctuary (officially the Gerry E. Studds Stellwagen Bank National Marine Sanctuary) is an 842-square-mile (638-square-nautical-mile) federally protected marine sanctuary located at the mouth of Massachusetts Bay, between Cape Cod and Cape Ann. It is known as an excellent whale watching site, and is home to many other species of marine life.

Stellwagen Bank

Upwelling at the shelf break occurs because there are currents flowing along the coast, slower moving water at the bottom of the ocean due to friction, stratified water separated by density, salinity, and temperature, and a dramatic change in seafloor slope. The underwater cliff-edge of Stellwagen Bank runs parallel to the coastline and is referred to as the shelf break. The shelf break is a steep slope which descends thousands of feet to the ocean floor. Deep nutrient rich currents are forced upwards toward the surface when they come into contact with the steep slopes of the bank’s plateau. This upwelling brings nutrients to the surface for phytoplankton, which brings larger organisms to feed. 

Over 130 species from numerous classes of the animal kingdom call the bank home at least temporarily. Some such fish are the Atlantic cod, silver hake, yellow-tail flounder, blue-fin and yellow-fin tuna, striped bass, blue fish and numerous species of shark including the great white shark. Shellfish such as the American lobster, sea scallops, squid and ocean quahogs are also prevalent. Many marine birds call the bank home including gannets, shearwaters, storm petrels, fulmars, puffins and razorbills. Reptiles are even present, primarily being represented by the leatherback sea turtle. Possibly the most famous animals on Stellwagen Bank are the mammals. Five species of seals (harp seal, gray seal, harbor seal, hooded seal, and ringed seal), and numerous whale species swim in the waters of Stellwagen. Whale watchers can frequently see humpback whales, minke whales and fin whales.   There are occasional sightings of one of the most critically endangered whale species, North Atlantic right whale. Several other whale species can also be seen here including the sperm whale, beluga, orca, pilot whale, White-beaked dolphin, Atlantic white-sided dolphin, common dolphin, bottlenose dolphin, Risso’s dolphin, harbor porpoise, blue whale, and sei whale.

History
Stellwagen Bank owes much of its existence to the last major ice age. 25,000 years ago, the Laurentide Ice Sheet advanced over the eastern United States, pushing in front of it large amounts of earth and rocks. The southern margin of the glaciers formed local geographical features including Cape Cod and Stellwagen Bank. Originally, the bank was above water, but gradually subsided over time as the post-glacial rebound subsided.

In the 17th century it was observed that the area made for excellent fishing. Large cod and tuna were frequently caught in the area, and whaling ships caught many whales in the area.

In 1854, the US Navy sent Lieutenant Commander Henry Stellwagen to survey and map the area. It was known that there was a bank in the area, but its extent and shape were not known. Sounding could show ships how close they were to the dangerous waters of Boston Harbor, and so better maps were needed.

Prior to Stellwagen's survey, it was believed there were two small banks in the area: one just to the north of Cape Cod, and one in the middle of the entrance to Massachusetts Bay. Stellwagen showed that they were part of one large bank. As a result, the Navy named the bank after him in 1855.

On October 7, 1992, Congress designated the area a National Marine Sanctuary.

In 1999, the DeepWorker 2000 submersible was used to quantify the species of fish as well as the space resources within the Sanctuary. Remotely operated underwater vehicles were used from 1993 to 2003 to make additional observations of the fish within the Sanctuary and adjacent locations.

The Sanctuary's headquarters is located in Scituate, Massachusetts.

References

External links
 Stellwagen Bank National Marine Sanctuary homepage

National Marine Sanctuaries of the United States
Wildlife refuges in Massachusetts
Plateaus of the Atlantic Ocean
Protected areas established in 1992
1992 establishments in Massachusetts